This is the complete list of Commonwealth Games medallists in squash from 1998 to 2018.

Men's singles

Women's singles

Men's doubles

Women's doubles

Mixed doubles

References
Results Database from the Commonwealth Games Federation

Squash
Medalists

Commonw